Pristimantis lichenoides is a species of frogs in the family Strabomantidae. It is endemic to Colombia and is only known from the vicinity of its type locality near Samaná in the Caldas Department, on the eastern slope of the Cordillera Central (Colombian Andes). The specific name lichenoides refers to its lichen-like dorsal coloration as well as its habit of being plastered to rock surfaces, resembling lichens growing on rocks.

Description
Adult males measure  and adult females  in snout–vent length. The head is as wide as the body and wider than it is long. The snout is rounded in dorsal view but subtruncate in lateral view. The tympanum is small but visible, with its upper edge hidden by the thick supratympanic fold. The fingers have lateral keels and round terminal discs. The lateral keels of the toes coalesce as basal webbing; the toe discs are slightly smaller than those on the fingers. Dorsal skin bears granules. Dorsal coloration is dark green to pale olive with darker mottling and rust or beige scapular and vertebral blotches. Sides of the head have black markings. The lips are burnt yellow with black labial bars. The flanks are creamy yellow with brown reticulation. The throat is yellow while the abdomen is pale yellow to pale brown with brown or grey reticulation.

Habitat and conservation
Development is direct (i.e., there is no free-living larval stage). 

Pristimantis lichenoides  is an uncommon species with a very limited known range, though this is partly because of the limited survey effort. It is threatened by habitat loss caused by subsistence wood collecting, pine plantations, and agricultural development.

References

lichenoides
Amphibians of the Andes
Amphibians of Colombia
Endemic fauna of Colombia
Amphibians described in 1997
Taxa named by John Douglas Lynch
Taxa named by José Vicente Rueda Almonacid
Taxonomy articles created by Polbot